Grūda is a river in Dzūkija National Park in southern Lithuania.

It begins near the state border of Lithuania and Belarus, in the Dainava Forest, in a lake that is called by the same name Grūda. It is a river of the plains, calmly meandering and leisurely carrying its waters across the Dainava plain. In Puvočiai, it flows into the Merkis. Thanks to the sandy soil and growing forests, the rivers in this area are characterized by water clarity and coolness. Since they are mainly fed by underground springs, the rivers do not freeze every winter. And in the often dry summer, they remain quite watery and can be washed.

References